Tim Hölscher (born 21 February 1995) is a German professional footballer who plays as an attacking midfielder.

Career

Early years
Hölscher started playing football at local SG Gronau at the age of three years. There he started out as a goalkeeper, but soon moved to the position of second striker. In 2006, he moved to the youth academy of Schalke 04, where he played in the centre-forward position.

Twente
In 2009, Dutch Eredivisie club Twente signed Hölscher to their academy. At the age of 17, he was awarded a three-year contract with the Enschede-based club in 2012. He would primarily be used in the second team Jong FC Twente in the 2012–13 season. After he had already completed the pre-season as a possible first-team prospect, he made his competitive debut in the first team on 12 July 2012 in the UEFA Europa League. He came on as a second-half substitute for Wout Brama in the second leg of the first qualifying round at UE Santa Coloma in Andorra. On 25 November 2012, Hölscher made his Eredivisie debut in the match against newly promoted PEC Zwolle. Manager Steve McClaren sent him on the pitch after an hour of play for Edwin Gyasi. He made his first appearance in the starting line-up of Twente on 6 December 2012 in the last game of the Europa League group stage against Helsingborgs IF.

In the last open days of the transfer window in summer 2014, Hölscher signed for German 3. Liga side Chemnitzer FC on one-year loan – despite also having had inquiries by Dutch Eredivisie clubs. The loan spell was terminated earlier on 30 December 2014, as he did not have had a lot prospect of gaining play time for the German side. He returned to Twente to be able to play for Jong FC Twente in the second half of the season.

Go Ahead Eagles and Esbjerg
For the 2017–18 season, Hölscher moved to the Dutch Eerste Divisie club Go Ahead Eagles. From there, he moved to the Danish Superliga club Esbjerg fB in winter 2017. Although he was utilised in all games there for the first half of 2018, he returned to Twente again in summer 2018.

Return to Twente
After a groin operation, Hölscher was injured from January 2019 and the rest of the 2018–19 season. In the 2019–20 season, until the premature end of the season due to the effects of the COVID-19 pandemic, he was only part of the matchday squad for six games, but did not actually make an appearance. Instead, he played a total of nine games with the second team. His contract was not renewed at the end of the season.

TOP Oss
Ahead of the 2020–21 season, Hölscher had not found a new club. On 1 February 2021, he signed a six-month contract with TOP Oss in the Eerste Divisie. He made his debut on 5 February in a 6–0 win over Jong AZ, coming on as a substitute for Lion Kaak in the 69th minute. Partly due to a hamstring injury, he only made four appearances for the club.

Dordrecht
In July 2021, Hölscher signed with Eerste Divisie club Dordrecht. He made his debut on 6 August, scoring the equaliser to secure a 1–1 home draw against Jong PSV.

References

External links
 
 

1995 births
Living people
People from Gronau, North Rhine-Westphalia
Sportspeople from Münster (region)
Association football midfielders
German footballers
German expatriate footballers
FC Schalke 04 players
FC Twente players
Chemnitzer FC players
Go Ahead Eagles players
Esbjerg fB players
TOP Oss players
FC Dordrecht players
Eredivisie players
Eerste Divisie players
3. Liga players
Danish 1st Division players
Germany youth international footballers
Expatriate footballers in the Netherlands
Expatriate men's footballers in Denmark
German expatriate sportspeople in Denmark
German expatriate sportspeople in the Netherlands
Footballers from North Rhine-Westphalia
Jong FC Twente players